is a Burmese singer. He is the lead vocalist of PrizmaX, a J-pop idol boy band. He has appeared in films and television dramas in Japan and Myanmar, as well as in the American film Ready Player One (2018).

Early life and education 
Morisaki was born Win Kyaw Htoo (ဝင်းကျော်ထူး), nicknamed Ah Win, to Burmese parents in Yangon, Myanmar. His parents worked abroad in Japan during his early childhood and he lived in Myanmar with his grandmother until the age of ten, when he moved to Japan to join his parents. Morisaki was scouted at the age of 14 to join the entertainment industry.

Career
In 2008, Morisaki joined J-pop idol boy band PrizmaX, managed by Stardust Promotion. In August 2010, he became a member of NAKED BOYZ together with other PrizmaX members (except Tsubasa Shimada), but withdrew at the end of the year. Morisaki made his film debut in the Yutaka Ozaki film Sherry in 2012. He was selected as the first radio personality at FM Yokohama in April 2015.

Morisaki made his Hollywood debut in Steven Spielberg's Ready Player One (2018) as Daito.

Morisaki played a small supporting role alongside Wutt Hmone Shwe Yi in a Burmese-language film, Zati Myay (ဇာတိမြေ), directed by Kyi Phyu Shin.  He received 'Popular awards' from Shwe FM's 8th Anniversary on October 1, 2017.

In August 2018, he was appointed a Myanmar tourism ambassador.

In 2022, Morisaki served as the performer for the TV Asahi tokusatsu series Avataro Sentai Donbrothers with the songs “Ore koso Only One” (Opening theme) and “Don't Boo! Donbrothers“ (Ending theme).

Filmography

Film

Television

Video games

Dubbing 
 Cats, Mr. Mistoffelees (Laurie Davidson)

Awards

References

External links
  
 PrizmaX A GoGo 
 

1990 births
Living people
Japanese male pop singers
21st-century Japanese male actors
Burmese emigrants to Japan
People from Yangon
Burmese male actors
21st-century Burmese male singers
21st-century Japanese male singers
21st-century Japanese singers
Burmese-language singers
Japanese-language singers